Mario Tosi (Born in Rome, Lazio, Italy on May 11, 1935 – Died in Fort Lauderdale, FL on November 11, 2021) was an Italian-American painter, cinematographer and cameraman. Tosi's works include The Killing Kind (1973), Report to the Commissioner (1975), Carrie (1976), and Sybil (1976), for which he was nominated for an Emmy. Tosi was the recipient of the Lifetime Achievement Award at the 2009 Fort Lauderdale International Film Festival.

References

External links
 

1942 births
2021 deaths
Italian cinematographers